4 Friends is a 2010 Indian Malayalam-language comedy-drama film directed by Saji Surendran. It stars Jayaram, Kunchacko Boban, Jayasurya and Meera Jasmine in the lead roles with Kamal Haasan appears in a cameo appearance as himself.

The film was released on 28 October 2010. It was dubbed into Tamil as Anbulla Kamal.

Synopsis
Roy, Surya, Amir, and Gauri come from entirely different backgrounds, but one thing that they have in common is cancer. Roy is a multi-millionaire; Amir is a small-time goonda; Soorya is an MBA student; and Gouri is an MBBS student. Each of them is dying from the disease (blood, liver, bone, and lung cancer) and they all come for treatment to a plush hospital, Pratheeksha, run by Dr. Nandakumar. Though they take some time to become friends, they eventually become close. They decide to go to Malaysia to meet Surya's girlfriend because they want to be positive in their lives forms rest of the story.

Cast
 Jayaram as Roy Mathew, the MD of RM Group, a multinational company
 Kunchacko Boban as Surya, an MBA student
 Jayasurya as Amir, a thug who earns a living by selling black tickets in theatres and gang works
 Meera Jasmine as Gauripriya, a brilliant fourth semester MBBS student
 Lalu Alex as Haridas, Surya's father
 Siddique as Dr. Siddharth
 Salim Kumar as Kochaouseppe, a staff in Pratheeksha
 Suraj Venjaramoodu as Ringgit Sasi
 Sukumari as Amir' grand mother
 K. B. Ganesh Kumar as Dr. Nandhagopal 
 Manikuttan as Vishnu, Gouri's brother (voiceover by Jis Joy)
 Prem Prakash as Murali, Gouri's father
 Sarayu as Vineetha
 Seema as Lathika, Surya's mother
 Srinda as Ayisha, Amir's sister
 Kamal Haasan as himself (cameo appearance)

Production

The film was shot at locations besides Kerala and Malaysia. It was produced by Tomichan Mulakuppadam under the company Mulakuppadam Films on a budget of 5.75 crore. Mahadevan Thampi was the still photographer of the film.

Soundtrack 
 
The soundtrack was composed by M. Jayachandran, with lyrics penned by Kaithapram. It features three original compositions and a remix version of the 1975 hit song "Yeh Dosti" from the film Sholay.

References

External links

 

2010s Malayalam-language films
Films scored by M. Jayachandran
2010s buddy comedy-drama films
2010 films
Indian buddy comedy-drama films
Films shot in Kerala
Films shot in Kochi
Films shot in Malaysia
Films directed by Saji Surendran